Eccleshill is a civil parish in Blackburn with Darwen, Lancashire, England.  It contains two buildings that are recorded in the National Heritage List for England as designated listed buildings, all of which are listed at Grade II.  This grade is the lowest of the three gradings given to listed buildings and is applied to "buildings of national importance and special interest".  The parish is rural, and the listed buildings both originated as farmhouses.

Buildings

References

Citations

Sources

Buildings and structures in Blackburn with Darwen
Lists of listed buildings in Lancashire